Egidio Capra (27 May 1914 – 29 March 1958) was an Italian professional footballer who played as a forward.

Club career
Capra played for 4 seasons (93 games, 22 goals) in the Serie A for A.C. Milan and Modena F.C.

International career
Capra made his debut for the Italy national football team on 31 October 1937 in a game against Switzerland.

Personal life
Capra's older brother Pietro Capra played football professionally. To distinguish them, Pietro was referred to as Capra I and Egidio as Capra II.

External links
 

1914 births
1958 deaths
Italian footballers
Italy international footballers
Serie A players
Serie B players
A.C. Milan players
S.S.D. Lucchese 1905 players
Modena F.C. players
F.C. Pavia players
U.S. Cremonese players
Como 1907 players
A.C. Legnano players
Association football forwards
A.S.D. Fanfulla players